Hemopsis is a genus of moths of the family Crambidae.

Species
Hemopsis angustalis (Snellen, 1890)
Hemopsis dissipatalis (Lederer, 1863)

References

Spilomelinae
Crambidae genera